Péter Hannich (born 30 March 1957) is Hungarian former professional footballer who played as an attacking midfielder.

Club career
Born in Győr, Hannich played for Győri ETO FC in the 1980s, winning two Hungarian championships in 1982 and 1983. He was the league's top scorer with 22 goals in the 1981–82 season. He later moved to AS Nancy, playing 14 matches and scoring 1 goal in the 1986–87 season.

International career
Hannich debuted for the Hungary national team on 18 April 1982 against Peru, and earned a total of 27 caps and scored 2 goals, and took part in the 1986 FIFA World Cup.

References
 asnl.net

External links
 
 
 

1957 births
Living people
Association football midfielders
Sportspeople from Győr
Hungarian people of German descent
Hungarian footballers
Hungary international footballers
1986 FIFA World Cup players
Ligue 1 players
AS Nancy Lorraine players
Győri ETO FC players
Hungarian expatriate footballers
Expatriate footballers in France
Hungarian expatriate sportspeople in France
Expatriate footballers in Austria
Hungarian expatriate sportspeople in Austria